Derric Rossy (born July 2, 1980) is an American former professional boxer and a former defensive end at Boston College. He enrolled in the Lynch School of Education with a major in human development.

Rossy knocked out Gary Bell in the second round to win the vacant New York State heavyweight title. He has also sparred with Tomasz Adamek.

Early life 
Rossy played football at Patchogue-Medford High School in Medford, New York. As a senior, he won All-American honors from SuperPrep magazine, received an All-America honorable mention from USA Today, was an all-state and all-Long Island selection, and received the Hansen Award as the Suffolk County Most Valuable Player. He was also a member of his school's basketball and baseball teams.

Amateur career 
Rossy fought only 10 amateur bouts and won the 2004 New York City Golden Gloves.

Professional career 
Rossy turned pro in 2004. He cruised through his first 15 bouts before suffering his first loss in a bout for the USBA heavyweight title to Eddie Chambers in 2007. In this bout Rossy suffered a broken ear drum and other injuries which short circuited his try for the title. After the Chambers loss, Rossy rebounded against journeyman veteran Zack Page winning a unanimous decision. On January 26, 2008 Derric and his promoter Sal Musumeci’s Final Forum Boxing made boxing history by promoting a heavyweight title fight for the first time in China. The event took place in the Venetian Arena, and was broadcast live before one-hundred and fifty-million viewers in China. The fight featured former world heavyweight Champion, Ray Mercer taking on Derric Rossy for the WBO/NABO Heavyweight Title, the WBC Asian Boxing Council Heavyweight Title, and the WBF Intercontinental Heavyweight Title. Looking impressive and winning by a unanimous decision. On May 3, 2008, Rossy received his second loss by German based heavyweight Alexander Dimitrenko. The fight was stopped in the fifth round, giving Dimitrenko his fourth consecutive victory by TKO and the fight was for Dimitrenko's WBO Inter-Continental heavyweight belt.

Rossy has never managed get past journeyman status, but has faced several notable opponents, including Kubrat Pulev, Audley Harrison, Fres Oquendo, and Joe Hanks. In his most recent fight, he lost a controversial decision to the unbeaten contender Vyacheslav Glazkov.

Professional boxing record

References

External links
 

Living people
1980 births
Heavyweight boxers
Boxers from New York (state)
American male boxers
Lynch School of Education and Human Development alumni